Atteria docima is a species of moth of the family Tortricidae first described by Herbert Druce in 1912. It is found in Peru.

References

Moths described in 1912
Atteriini
Moths of South America